This is a list of the first women lawyer(s) and judge(s) in Mississippi. It includes the year in which the women were admitted to practice law (in parentheses). Also included are women who achieved other distinctions such becoming the first in their state to graduate from law school or become a political figure

Firsts in state history

Lawyers 

Susie Blue Buchanan (1918): First female lawyer in Mississippi. She was also the first female admitted to practice before the Supreme Court of Mississippi (1916), as well as argue a murder case before that court (1917).
 Marian Wright Edelman (1963): First African American female lawyer in Mississippi
 Doris Bobadilla (1991): First known Hispanic American female lawyer in Mississippi

State judges 

 Zelma Wells Price (1929): First female judge in Mississippi (1955)
Constance Slaughter-Harvey (1970): First African American female judge in Mississippi (1976)
Lenore L. Prather (1955): First female to serve on the Mississippi Supreme Court (1982) and its Chief Justice (1998)
Mary Libby Payne: First female to serve on the Court of Appeals in Mississippi (1995)
 Ermea Russell: First African American female to serve on the Mississippi Court of Appeals (2011)
Donna Barnes: First female to serve as the Chief Judge of the Mississippi Court of Appeals (2019)
Tomika Harris-Irving: First African American (female) to serve on the Twenty-Second Circuit Court District in Mississippi (2019)

Federal judges 
Linda Anderson: First African American (female) to serve as a Magistrate Judge of the U.S. District Court for the Southern District of Mississippi (2006)
Sharion Aycock (1980): First female to serve on the U.S. District Court for the Northern District of Mississippi (2007)
Katharine Malley Samson: First female to serve as a bankruptcy court judge in Mississippi (2010)
Debra M. Brown (1997): First African American female to serve on the U.S. District Court for the Northern District of Mississippi (2013)

Attorney General 

 Lynn Fitch: First female to serve as the Attorney General of Mississippi (2020)

Assistant Attorney General 

 Evelyn Gandy (1947): First female appointed as the Assistant Attorney General of Mississippi (1959)

United States Attorney 

 Felicia C. Adams: First female to serve as a U.S. Attorney in Mississippi (2011)

Assistant United States Attorney 

 Euple Dozier: First female to serve as an Assistant U.S. Attorney in Mississippi (1955)

Assistant District Attorney 

 Kathy King Jackson: First female to serve as an Assistant District Attorney in Mississippi (1977)

Political Office 

 Evelyn Gandy (1947): First female (a lawyer) to serve as the Lieutenant Governor of Mississippi (1976-1980)

Bar Association 

 Joy Lambert Phillips (1980): First female to serve as the President of the Mississippi Bar Association (2005)
 Patricia W. Bennett: First African American female to serve as the President of the Mississippi Bar Association (2018)

Firsts in local history

 Patricia Burchell: First female to serve as the District Attorney for Forrest and Perry Counties, Mississippi (2010)
 Latrice Westbrooks: First African American female to serve as the Assistant District Attorney for the Second Circuit Court District (1997) [Hancock, Harrison and Stone Counties, Mississippi]
 Michele Purvis Harris (1987): First female (and African American female) to serve as the Chief City Prosecutor for the City of Jackson, Mississippi (1994) [Hinds, Madison and Rankin Counties, Mississippi]
 Mary Lee Toles: First African American (female) judge in Natchez, Mississippi [Adams County, Mississippi]
 Marie Kepper (1954): First female judge in Forrest County, Mississippi
 Clare Sekul Hornsby: First female to serve as the President of the Harrison County Bar Association
 Faye Peterson: First African American female to serve as the District Attorney for Hinds County, Mississippi
 Michele Purvis Harris (1987): First female (and African American female) to serve as the Chief City Prosecutor for the City of Jackson, Mississippi (1994) and the Public Defender for Hinds County, Mississippi (2012)
 Ermea Russell: First African American female to serve as a circuit judge in Hinds County, Mississippi (1998)
 Tomie Green: First female (and African American) to serve as the Senior Circuit Judge in the Seventh Circuit Court District [Hinds County, Mississippi]
 Constance Slaughter-Harvey: First African American female graduate of the University of Mississippi School of Law [Lafayette County, Mississippi]. She was the first African American female judge in Scott County, Mississippi (1976).
 Edna Loeb (1936): First female lawyer in Lowndes County, Mississippi
 Patricia Wise: First female (and African American female) to serve as President of the Magnolia Bar Association [Pike County, Mississippi]
 Shequeena McKenzie: First African American (female) judge in McComb, Mississippi (2022) [Pike County, Mississippi]
 Carol L. White-Richard: First African-American female to serve as the Public Defender for Washington County, Mississippi
 Caroline Crawley Moore: First female prosecutor in Winton County, Mississippi (2008)
 Ruth Campbell (1918): First female called to the Yazoo County Bar Association, Mississippi

See also  

 List of first women lawyers and judges in the United States
 Timeline of women lawyers in the United States
 Women in law

Other topics of interest 

 List of first minority male lawyers and judges in the United States
 List of first minority male lawyers and judges in Mississippi

References 

Lawyers, Mississippi, first
Mississippi, first
Women, Mississippi, first
Women, Mississippi, first
Women in Mississippi
Lists of people from Mississippi
Mississippi lawyers